Oak Hills Place is a census-designated place (CDP) in East Baton Rouge Parish, Louisiana, United States. The population was 8,195 at the 2010 census. It is part of the Baton Rouge Metropolitan Statistical Area, and one of the most affluent suburbs of Baton Rouge.

It is in the proposed City of St. George.

Geography
Oak Hills Place is located in southern East Baton Rouge Parish at  (30.366159, -91.089250). It is bordered to the east by Village St. George, across Siegen Lane, and to the north partially by the city of Baton Rouge.

Demographics

As of the 2020 United States census, there were 9,239 people, 3,818 households, and 2,192 families residing in the CDP.

As of the census of 2000, there were 7,996 people, 2,989 households, and 2,253 families residing in the CDP. The racial makeup of the CDP was 82.45% White, 12.16% African American, 0.21% Native American, 3.53% Asian, 0.04% Pacific Islander, 0.41% from other races, and 1.20% from two or more races. Hispanic or Latino of any race were 2.50% of the population.

There were 2,989 households, out of which 39.0% had children under the age of 18 living with them, 65.7% were married couples living together, 7.6% had a female householder with no husband present, and 24.6% were non-families. 20.2% of all households were made up of individuals, and 4.7% had someone living alone who was 65 years of age or older. The average household size was 2.67 and the average family size was 3.13.

In the CDP, the population was spread out, with 27.9% under the age of 18, 7.7% from 18 to 24, 28.1% from 25 to 44, 28.4% from 45 to 64, and 7.8% who were 65 years of age or older. The median age was 37 years. For every 100 females, there were 93.0 males. For every 100 females age 18 and over, there were 89.4 males.

The median income for a household in the CDP was $77,668, and the median income for a family was $90,444. Males had a median income of $63,571 versus $32,207 for females. The per capita income for the CDP was $64,994. About 0.1% of families and 0.2% of the population were below the poverty line, including 2.1% of those under age 18 and 2.7% of those age 65 or over.

Education
East Baton Rouge Parish Public Schools serves Oak Hills Place.

Most of the community is served by Wildwood Elementary School, while the northern portion is served by Westminster Elementary School in Westminster. Most of the area is served by Kenilworth Middle School, while Woodlawn Middle School serves a section in the northeast.  Kenilworth is under the administration of the Recovery School District of Louisiana, and the portion of the Kenilworth zone which houses most of the CDP has Westdale Middle School, directly controlled by EBR Schools, as an option. Most residents are served by Tara High School while some to the northeast are served by Woodlawn High School.

The private school The Dunham School is in Oak Hills Place.

References

Census-designated places in Louisiana
Census-designated places in East Baton Rouge Parish, Louisiana
Baton Rouge metropolitan area